Peter To Rot (5 March 1912 - 7 July 1945) was a Papua New Guinea Roman Catholic. He served as a well-noted and beloved catechist in his village and was entrusted with the local parish during World War II when the Japanese occupied the region. He stood up for religious values in the face of Japanese oppression and continued to hold secret services when the Japanese restricted him from active pastoral service. To Rot valued marriage - he himself had been married since 1936 - and he was an outspoken critic of Japanese views on taking multiple wives.

His beatification was celebrated in Papua New Guinea in 1995.

Life

Education and marriage
Peter To Rot was born on 5 March 1912 on the New Pomerania island in the then-German New Guinea as the third of six children to Angelo Tu Puia (the well-respected village chief) and Maria Ia Tumul who had both converted to Roman Catholicism in 1898.

His father taught him the basics of catechism and sent him to the local mission school in 1919 despite the fact that education was not an obligation at the time. He was quite agile in climbing coconut trees and he was more than willing to do this to acquire coconuts for older villages. It was rare for him to be mischievous at school but he was honest and quick to help those in need. In 1930 the parish priest of Rakunai - Father Laufer - asked his father if he would allow To Rot to start his studies for the priesthood. His father said that the time was not right for that but it would be more than appropriate if his son studied to become a catechist. In 1930 he began his studies at Saint Paul's College of the Missionaries of the Sacred Heart in Taliligap after which he was commissioned as a catechist for the parish of Rakunai in 1933 when the local bishop gave him the catechist's cross. To Rot then returned to his village where he would go on to aid Father Laufer. He was an excellent teacher and an organizer of classes for people and he had a Bible on his person at all times.

On 11 November 1936 he married Paula Ia Varpit and the couple went on to have three children; one died as an infant and another died soon after the war. His final child lived into old age and was born after To Rot's death. The pair were married in a church though some of the local and traditional customs were observed.

Catechist
Once the Japanese forces occupied the nation in March 1942 (forcing an Australian garrison out) their soldiers interned all of the foreign missionaries though remained indifferent to religion on the whole. The parish priest left To Rot in charge of his parish and he became its active leader as a result of this. In this role he cared for those who were ill and poor while also aiming to better educate converts. Towards late 1943 the Japanese authorities restricted religious services and a few months later forbade them in full. But To Rot continued to hold them in secret and did not fear the implications on his own life despite the fear of those around him. The destruction of the church a short while later saw him build a "bush church" outside the village to hold secret services; he kept records of baptisms and weddings there.

Metepa was married Christian and a policeman who worked for the Japanese; he lusted after a Protestant's wife named Ia Mentil. To Rot and Mentil's father prevented Metepa from kidnapping Mentil as his second wife and the furious officer reported him to his superior Kueka who summoned To Rot. The Japanese authorities had legalised taking a second wife but To Rot opposed this as being the opposite to doctrine. To Rot met Kueka who ordered that he cease his pastoral activities while meanwhile Metepa and another seized Mentil and beat up her husband. But To Rot and the village chief managed to find Mentil and get her back to Rakunai. This event served to augment To Rot's defense of traditional marriage with spies monitoring him to catch him in the act of piousness so as to arrest him. One couple reported him and the police arrested him after finding religious objects in a house search. He was planting vegetables to give to the Japanese when he was arrested on Christmas 1944.

To Rot was taken to the police headquarters where the chief of the police Meshida asked if he was preaching to which the catechist affirmed. Meshida beat him on the face and the back of his neck and ordered him to be imprisoned. The Methodist chief of Navunaram and the Christian Rakunai chief failed to secure his release even though he told them not to fret over it. He confided to his mother that he would die but assured her that he was more than prepared to die for Jesus Christ if that was the case; he was locked in a small and windowless cell. To Rot was sentenced to two months' imprisonment in the Vunaiara concentration camp. On one occasion his wife and two children came to visit him and she begged him to give up being a catechist so he would remain safe. But To Rot was adamant he would not relinquish his responsibilities to the people. On the date of his death he said to his mother: "the police told me that, this evening, a Japanese doctor will come to give me some medicine. Surprising since I'm not sick. I suspect this is a trick". He told his wife to bring his cross and good clothes so he could go to God dressed in proper attire.

Death
He was given lethal injection in 1945 and then given something to drink. But the guards saw that the poison was slow so made him lie down while the doctor covered his mouth; he was stricken with convulsions and was held down as he died while being struck on the back of his neck with a beam. Upon his death a policeman went to Rakunai and said: "Your catechist is dead". The incredulous chief of the village demanded to know what the officers did to To Rot but the officer said: "He fell ill and died". His uncle Taura was sent to the prison with Commander Meshida to view To Rot's remains and to take them for burial. His remains were found warm and still curled up with cotton stuffed in his ears and nose with blood and a red scarf wrapped around his neck. The back of his neck was swollen and bore wounds and a clear needle mark was present on his right arm. To Rot's remains were soon buried in Rakunai.

Commemoration
Pope Benedict XVI - in 2012 - encouraged all married couples to look to To Rot's "example of courage" and he later dispatched Cardinal Joseph Zen Ze-kium to participate in the celebrations at Rabaul to mark the centennial of the late catechist's birth. The pope had discussed To Rot in his "ad limina" meeting with the Papuan bishops on 9 June 2012 while the Archbishop of Rabaul Francesco Panfilo issued a pastoral letter around that time addressing the life and example of To Rot.

On 5 March 2012 the Papuan government issued a series of postage stamps in honor of the centennial of his birth.

Beatification
The beatification process began on 14 January 1986 after the Congregation for the Causes of Saints issued the official "nihil obstat" to the cause and titled him as a Servant of God; the formal diocesan phase collecting documentation occurred in the Rabaul archdiocese from 21 January 1987 until 30 March 1989 when all documents were sealed in boxes and sent to Rome for the C.C.S. to review. The C.C.S. validated this inquest on 2 June 1989 and after received the Positio dossier from the postulation of the cause in 1991. Theologians approved the dossier's contents on 26 June 1992 as did the C.C.S. members on 1 December 1992. His beatification received approval from Pope John Paul II on 2 April 1993 after the pope confirmed that To Rot had been killed "in odium fidei" (in hatred of the faith). John Paul II beatified To Rot on 17 January 1995 while on his visit to Papua New Guinea. 

The current postulator for this cause is Fr. Tomas Ravaioli.

Feast
His liturgical feast is affixed to the date of his death as is the norm. He is included in the Roman Rite liturgical calendar in his native Papua New Guinea as well as in the Solomon Islands and in Australia as well as for the Missionaries of the Sacred Heart.

References

External links

 Hagiography Circle
 Saints SQPN
 Voice of Peter To Rot
 Our Faith in Action
 Catholic News Agency
 Catholic News Agency (2)
 For Your Marriage
 Loyola Press
 Melbourne Catholic
 Saints Resource
 Australian Dictionary of Biography
 Encyclopedia.com
 Saint Kateri Parish
 Aleteia
 Catholics United for the Faith

1912 births
1945 deaths
20th-century Roman Catholic martyrs
20th-century venerated Christians
Beatifications by Pope John Paul II
Deaths by beating
Deaths from asphyxiation
Papua New Guinean beatified people
Papua New Guinean murder victims
Papua New Guinean Roman Catholics
People murdered in Papua New Guinea
Roman Catholic religious educators
Venerated Catholics
People executed by Japanese occupation forces